Old Georgians, sometimes abbreviated to OG, refers to old boys/girls of schools with George in the name of the school, including:
St George's College, Harare, Zimbabwe
St George's School, Harpenden, Hertfordshire
King George V College, Southport, Merseyside
St. George's Institution, Malaysia
St. George's College, Quilmes, Argentina
 St George's College, Weybridge, Surrey, England

It may also refer to:
Old Georgian Club, a rugby and cricket club from Palermo, Buenos Aires
Old Georgians Hockey Club, English field hockey premier league team

See also
King George School (disambiguation), various schools
Old Georgian language